Poulet is a French surname, meaning chicken. Notable people with the name include:

 Anne Poulet (born 1942), American art historian
 Gaston Poulet (1892–1974), French violinist and conductor
 Georges Poulet (1902–1991), Belgian literary critic
 J. Poulet (fl. 1811–1818), English cricketer
 Olivia Poulet (born 1978), English actress and screenwriter
 Paul Poulet (1887–1946), Belgian mathematician
 Quentin Poulet (fl. 1477–1506), Burgundian Catholic priest, scribe, illuminator, and librarian
 Robert Poulet (1893–1989), Belgian writer, literary critic and journalist
 William Poulet (publisher), pseudonym used by Jean-Paul Wayenborgh to write his History of Spectacles "Die Brille"
 Auguste Poulet-Malassis (1825–1878), French printer and publisher

See also
 Poulett
 Poulette (disambiguation)